Asiatic: IIUM Journal of English Language and Literature is a biannual peer-reviewed academic journal published by the International Islamic University Malaysia and focusing on literary and linguistics works by Asian and Asian diaspora writers. The journal's founding editor-in-chief is Mohammad A. Quayum (International Islamic University Malaysia and Flinders University). The journal's current editor-in-chief is Md. Mahmudul Hasan (International Islamic University Malaysia). Each issue has sections covering critical writings,  creative writing, and reviews and review articles on books, novels, and plays on Asian topics written in English.

Abstracting and indexing 
The journal is abstracted and indexed in the MLA International Bibliography, EBSCO databases, Scopus, and the Emerging Sources Citation Index.

References

External links
 

2007 establishments in Malaysia
Literary magazines
Linguistics journals
Publications established in 2007
English-language journals
Biannual journals
International Islamic University Malaysia